These are the number-one singles of 1968 according to the Top 100 Singles chart in Cashbox magazine.

See also 
1968 in music
List of Hot 100 number-one singles of 1968 (U.S.)

References 
http://members.aol.com/_ht_a/randypny2/cashbox/1968.html
https://web.archive.org/web/20101121003349/http://cashboxmagazine.com/archives/60s_files/1968.html
http://musicseek.info/no1hits/1968.htm

1968
1968 record charts
1968 in American music